"Righteous" is a song by American rapper and singer Juice Wrld. It is the first posthumous single released with him as the lead artist.  It was released on April 24, 2020, via Grade A Productions through exclusive licensing to Interscope Records, as the lead single for his posthumous album, Legends Never Die.

Background and composition
Juice Wrld's family announced "Righteous" would be releasing hours before it was released at midnight on April 24, 2020. Rolling Stone described the song as "pensive" and that it "addresses anxiety and trying to quell it by self-medicating while also acknowledging the cyclical addiction that ensues." 

Lyrically, Juice Wrld dances around the theme of death in the song with the lyrics "Over ice, I'm freezing/Beautiful eyes, deceiving/We may die this evening/Coughing, wheezing, bleeding," and "High, I'm an anxious soul/Blood moons are my eyes, stay low/Red and black, they glow/Under attack, in my soul/When it's my time, I'll know."

Stylistically, Stereogum describes the track as a "melancholy swoon built from arpeggiated guitar riffs and moonbeam melodies; it's all smooth edges, moody textures, breathy vocals."

"Righteous" was produced by Nick Mira and Charlie Handsome. Mira has worked with Juice Wrld in the past on multiple songs, including Juice Wrld's multi-platinum-certified single, "Lucid Dreams". The song was recorded at Juice Wrld's home studio in Los Angeles.

Music video 
The official music video for the song was published on the same day the song was released on Juice Wrld's YouTube channel. The video was directed, shot and edited by Steve Cannon. 

The first half of the video shows footage of Juice Wrld in his daily life including touring, traveling and recording at various studios. The second half of the video is an animation depicting Juice Wrld fighting his inner demons before changing forms and leaving Earth. The video concludes with him disappearing into space.

Cannon first started working with Juice Wrld in March 2018 as a photographer and videographer.

Personnel 
Credits adapted from Spotify.
Jarad Higgins – vocals, composition
Nick Mira – writer, producer
Ryan "Charlie Handsome" Vojtesak – writer, producer

Charts

Weekly charts

Year-end charts

Certifications

Release history

References

External links
 

2020 singles
2020 songs
Animated music videos
Juice Wrld songs
Interscope Records singles
Songs released posthumously
Songs written by Nick Mira
Songs written by Juice Wrld
American alternative rock songs